Top Model, cycle 6 is the sixth cycle of an ongoing reality television series based on Tyra Banks' America's Next Top Model that pits contestants from Poland against each other in a variety of competitions to determine who will win the title of the next Polish Top Model.

Joanna Krupa, who also serves as the lead judge, returned to host the sixth cycle. Other judges included fashion designer Dawid Woliński, fashion show director Kasia Sokołowska and photographer Marcin Tyszka. This is the third season of the show to feature male contestants in the cast after cycles 4 and 5. Among the prizes for the season are a contract with Avant Models, an appearance on the cover of the Polish issue of Glamour and 100,000 złotys (US$30,000).

The international destinations this cycle are, Madrid and Eilat.

Contestants
(ages stated are at start of contest)

Episodes

Episode 1
Original aridate: 

Auditions for the sixth season of Top Model begin, and aspiring hopefuls are chosen for the semi-final round.

Episode 2
Original airdate: 

In the semi-finals, the judges begin to eliminate contestants to narrow the number of models who will battle it out for a place in the final fifteen.

Episode 3
Original airdate: 

In the third and final casting episode of the season, the judges choose the finalists who will move onto the main competition out of the remaining pool of contestants.

Names in bold represent eliminated semi-finalists

Episode 4
Original airdate: 

Challenge winner: Ewa Niespodziana
Immune from elimination: Daniel Tracz, Daria Zhalina, Mateusz Zapotocki, Ola Zbinkowska, Patryk Grudowicz, Sasza Muzheiko & Zuza Matysiak
First call-out: Patryk Grudowicz
Bottom three: Kamil Popławski, Mariusz Tomczak & Mateusz Mil
Eliminated: Kamil Popławski
Featured photographers: Robert Wolański
Special guests: Łukasz Jemioł
Guest judge: Robert Wolański

Episode 5
Original airdate: 

First challenge winners: Daniel Tracz, Daria Zhalina, Ewa Niespodziana, Mateusz Mil & Natalia Karabasz
Second challenge winner: Adam Niedźwiedź
First call-out: Adam Niedźwiedź
Bottom three: Ewa Niespodziana, Kamila Warzecha & Zuza Matysiak
Eliminated: Zuza Matysiak
Featured photographers: Anna Bioda
Special guests: Basia Richards, Małgorzata Kożuchowska, Monika Mariotti, Maciej Musiałowski, Agnieszka Przepiórska
Guest judge: Anna Jurgaś

Episode 6
Original airdate: 

Challenge winner: Mateusz Mil
First call-out: Daria Zhalina 	
Bottom three: Ewa Niespodziana, Mariusz Tomczak & Sasza Muzheiko
Eliminated: Mariusz Tomczak
Special guests: Sandra Kubicka

Episode 7
Original airdate: 

First challenge winners: Ada Daniel, Ewa Niespodziana, Patryk Grudowicz & Sasza Muzheiko
Second challenge winners: Ewa Niespodziana & Patryk Grudowicz
Eliminated outside of judging panel: Sasza Muzheiko
First call-out: Ewa Niespodziana & Mateusz Mil
Bottom three: Kamila Warzecha, Mateusz Zapotocki & Ola Zbinkowska
Eliminated: Ola Zbinkowska
Featured photographer: Agnieszka Kulesza & Łukasz Pik
Special guests: Bartek Lipka, Małgorzata Leitner, Anna Jagodzinska
Guest judge: Anna Jagodzinska

Episode 8
Original airdate: 

Challenge winner: Mateusz Mil
Second challenge winners: Adam Niedźwiedź, Ewa Niespodziana & Mateusz Mil
First call-out: Patryk Grudowicz	
Bottom three: Ada Daniel, Mateusz Zapotocki & Natalia Karabasz
Eliminated: Mateusz Zapotocki
Special guests: Tamara Gonzalez-Perea, Weronika Książkiewicz, MasterChef Junior finalists (from I season)
Guest judge: Weronika Książkiewicz

Episode 9
Original airdate: 

Challenge winner: Daniel Tracz, Daria Zhalina & Mateusz Mil
Second challenge winner: Ada Daniel
First call-out: Daniel Tracz
Bottom two: Kamila Warzecha & Natalia Karabasz
Eliminated: Kamila Warzecha
Featured photographer: Jacek Kołodziejski
Special guests:  Anna Jurgaś, Michał Szpak, Dawid Kwiatkowski, Reni Jusis, Filip Bobek, Helen Graffner, Łukasz Tunikowski, Jan Wieczorkowski
Guest judge: Marta Kuligowska

Episode 10
Original airdate: 

Challenge winner: Ada Daniel
First call-out: Daniel Tracz
Bottom three: Daria Zhalina, Ewa Niespodziana & Mateusz Mil
Eliminated: Ewa Niespodziana & Mateusz Mil
Saved: Ewa Niespodziana
Featured photographer: Marcin Tyszka
Special guests: Karolina Pilarczyk, Michał Kuś, Anna Jagodzińska, Mariusz Przybylski
Guest judge: Mariusz Przybylski

Episode 11
Original airdate: 

Challenge winners: Daniel Tracz & Natalia Karabasz
Eliminated outside of judging panel: Adam Niedźwiedź
First call-out: Daria Zhalina
Bottom two: Ada Daniel & Ewa Niespodziana
Eliminated: Ada Daniel
Guest judge: Mónica Cruz

Episode 12
Original airdate: 

First call-out: Patryk Grudowicz
Bottom three: Daniel Tracz, Ewa Niespodziana & Natalia Karabasz
First Eliminated: Natalia Karabasz
Bottom two: Daniel Tracz & Ewa Niespodziana
Eliminated: Daniel Tracz
Guest judge: Michał Piróg

Episode 13
Original airdate: 

Final three: Daria Zhalina, Ewa Niespodziana & Patryk Grudowicz
Eliminated: Daria Zhalina
Final two: Ewa Niespodziana & Patryk Grudowicz
Poland's Next Top Model: Patryk Grudowicz
Guest judge: Anna Jagodzińska

Summaries

Call-out order

 The contestant was immune from elimination
 The contestant was eliminated
 The contestant was eliminated outside of judging panel
 The contestant was originally eliminated but was saved.
 The contestant won the competition

Bottom Two/Three/Four 

 The contestant was eliminated after their first time in the bottom two
 The contestant was eliminated after their second time in the bottom two
 The contestant was eliminated after their third time in the bottom two
 The contestant was eliminated outside of judging panel
 The contestant was eliminated in the final judging and placed third.
 The contestant was eliminated in the final judging and placed second.

Photo shoot guide
Episode 3 photo shoot: Group shots (semifinals)
Episode 4 photo shoot: Circus attractions
Episode 5 photo shoot: Nude shoot by a pool
Episode 6 photo shoot: Posing with pests on a railroad
Episode 7 photo shoot: Make love not war
Episode 8 photo shoot: Masterchef kids
Episode 9 photo shoot: Police intervention
Episode 10 photo shoots: Simplistic & high fashion by Marcin Tyszka
Episode 11 photo shoots: Windmill editorial
Episode 12 photo shoots: Haute couture in Madrid

Rating figures

References

 

Top Model (Polish TV series)